Dichomeris agonia is a moth in the family Gelechiidae. It is found in North America, where it has been recorded from Ontario, Massachusetts and Illinois to Florida, Louisiana, Arkansas and Pennsylvania.

The forewings are dark brown, with three prominent light ochreous dots, one on the middle of the wing, another smaller one just below it on the fold, and the third and largest at the end of the cell. At the beginning of the costal cilia are a few ochreous scales. The hindwings are dark fuscous. Adults have been recorded on wing from January to November.

The larvae feed on Oenothera, Aster and Solidago species.

References

Moths described in 1860
agonia